William Waterfield "Wild Bill" Widner was a professional baseball pitcher. He pitched all or part of five seasons in the majors, from  until , for the Cincinnati Red Stockings, Washington Nationals, Columbus Solons, and Cincinnati Kelly's Killers.

Sources

Major League Baseball pitchers
Cincinnati Red Stockings (AA) players
Washington Nationals (1886–1889) players
Columbus Solons players
Cincinnati Kelly's Killers players
New Orleans Pelicans (baseball) players
Sioux City Corn Huskers players
Mobile Blackbirds players
Milwaukee Brewers (minor league) players
Baseball players from Cincinnati
19th-century baseball players
1867 births
1908 deaths